The white-bellied rat (Niviventer niviventer) is a species of rodent in the family Muridae.

It is found in India, Nepal, Bhutan and Pakistan.

References

Niviventer
Mammals of Pakistan
Mammals of Nepal
Mammals described in 1836
Taxonomy articles created by Polbot